Haymond is a surname. Notable people with the surname include:

Alvin Haymond (born 1942), former American football defensive back
Creed Haymond, American track and field athlete
Thomas Haymond (1794–1869), nineteenth century congressman and lawyer from Virginia
Major William Haymond (1740–1821), born in the colony of Maryland, son of John Haymond and Margaret Calder
William S. Haymond (1823–1885), U.S. Representative from Indiana
Peter Haymond, current United States Ambassador to Laos
United States v. Haymond, a U.S. Supreme Court case

See also
Justice Haymond (disambiguation)